The Guided Advanced Tactical Rocket (GATR) is a weapons system under development by Orbital ATK and Elbit Systems. It is intended to provide a low-cost guided missile compatible with existing unguided 70mm rocket launch platforms such as the Hydra 70. The penetrating version of the GATR is equipped with a steel-cased M282 warhead and a programmable fuze. It can be set from the cockpit to detonate on impact or after a delay and is capable of penetrating a triple-brick wall and light-vehicle armor.

History
In April 2013, ATK was awarded a $3.2 million contract from the U.S. Special Operations Command to provide GATR precision guided missiles for evaluation.

Specifications
 Diameter: 70mm
 Guidance: Semi-active laser homing

See also
 Advanced Precision Kill Weapon System
 Direct Attack Guided Rocket
 FZ275 LGR
 Low-Cost Guided Imaging Rocket
 Roketsan Cirit

References

External links
 Elbit Systems Guided Advanced Tactical Rocket (GATR) webpage

Air-to-surface missiles of the United States
Alliant Techsystems